Jeff Napa (born September 19, 1981) is a Filipino professional basketball player and coach. He is the current head coach of the NU Bulldogs in the UAAP and currently serving as an assistant for the NorthPort Batang Pier in the PBA. He previously coached  the Letran Knights in the NCAA.

Playing career
Jeff Napa was part of the first-ever NU Bulldogs men's basketball team that made it to the Final Four phase of the UAAP basketball tournament in UAAP Season 64.
He also tied the record held by Allan Caidic for the most number of three-points made in a single UAAP game. However, the Bulldogs did not advance in the Finals series after their loss against De La Salle Green Archers in the final four series.

After his collegiate basketball career, Napa played for the teams John-O, Viva Mineral Water and Fash Liquid Laundry Detergent in the Philippine Basketball League.

Coaching career
In 2005, Manny Dandan, the then-head coach of NU Bulldogs invited Napa to join the team as an assistant coach and he later accepted it. Napa was later appointed as Head Coach of NU Bullpups junior's basketball team where he successfully steered three championships (Season 74, 76 and 78) with the squad in the last five years.

Move to Letran Knights
Napa emerged as one of the frontrunners for the coaching job of the Letran Knights, replacing NCAA Season 91 men's basketball champion coach Aldin Ayo who is now the head coach of the De La Salle Green Archers in the UAAP. Right after the championship run of NSNU Bullpups on the UAAP Season 78 juniors basketball tournament, Napa openly admitted in an interview that he is in talks with the Colegio de San Juan de Letran officials about his possibility to take over the coaching duty for Letran Knights. The search committee unanimously voted for Napa after a series of interviews of applicants including Napa, Mapua Cardinals assistant coach Randy Alcantara, Adamson Falcons assistant coach Mike Fermin, and Letran alumnus Elvis Tolentino.

On March 8, 2016, Napa was appointed as the new head coach of Letran Knights men's basketball team in a news conference held at the Salon de Actos in the Letran's main campus in Intramuros, Manila.

He also decided to stay in the NU Bullpups program as a team consultant. Napa's deputy, Chico Manabat, who is also the husband of volleyball player Dindin Santiago-Manabat, took over as head coach of the Bullpups starting Season 79. Manabat, Jay Agleron, and Leo Pujante also joined the coaching staff of the Knights.

Napa will be the second non-Letran alumnus to take the coaching job of the men's basketball team, after Louie Alas, who handled the team that won three championships in NCAA men's basketball.

Return to National University 
Napa will return to National University, this time coaching the seniors team NU Bulldogs starting in 2022.

Coaching record

Collegiate record

References

1981 births
Filipino men's basketball coaches
NU Bulldogs basketball players
Filipino men's basketball players
Living people
Letran Knights basketball coaches
NorthPort Batang Pier coaches